Dikļi Manor is a manor house in the historical region of Vidzeme, in northern Latvia. Dikļi Manor was built for Baron Paul von  in 1896 and includes a 20 ha park that is home to around twenty exotic trees,
such as the balsam fir and the Coast Douglas-fir.
Manor house now operates as hotel.

History 
It is known that prior to that it belonged to Rezede and Weipted, it may have been originally the side manor of Carlsberg Manor. The manor belonged to the Pahlen family until 1722, the end of Great Northern War. Later , then , became its owners. 
In 1786 manor was bought by Tiesenhausen noble family, who owned it until 1846. 
From 1846 to 1860 owners were  family. In 1919, the Valmiera District Administration, which was granted a manor, established a children's shelter here. In 1937 Dikļi manor became a sanatorium, in 1974 - the Republican Rehabilitation Hospital for Traumatology and Orthopedics.

See also
List of palaces and manor houses in Latvia

References

External links
 Dikļi Manor Homepage
 

Manor houses in Latvia